Chad Caldwell (born August 18, 1975) is an American politician who has served in the Oklahoma House of Representatives from the 40th district since 2014.

References

1975 births
Living people
Republican Party members of the Oklahoma House of Representatives
Place of birth missing (living people)
21st-century American politicians